The discography of American pop rock supergroup Fun consists of two studio albums, seven extended plays, 11 singles and seven music videos. Following the split of his previous band The Format, lead singer Nate Ruess formed Fun in 2008 with musicians Andrew Dost and Jack Antonoff, both of whom had previously toured with The Format. Fun began recording sessions for their debut album in September 2008 and embarked on a North American tour the following month. In May 2009, they issued their debut single, "At Least I'm Not as Sad (As I Used to Be)". Aim and Ignite, the band's first full-length album, was released by Nettwerk Records on August 25, 2009, and peaked at number 71 on the United States Billboard 200 chart. The album produced an additional two singles, "All the Pretty Girls" and "Walking the Dog", which were then followed by the release of the single "C'mon", a collaboration with American alternative rock band Panic! at the Disco.

The band's single "We Are Young", featuring American R&B singer Janelle Monáe, was released in September 2011, beginning a steady rise in popularity after gaining attention on online media and being covered on the television series Glee. It debuted on the Billboard Hot 100 in December, becoming the band's first single to enter a national record chart. The song's use in a Chevrolet Sonic Super Bowl commercial further increased sales of the song, and it eventually topped the Hot 100 and hit the top ten in multiple other countries, including Canada, Ireland, and the United Kingdom. It has become one of the best-selling singles of all-time, with sales of over 9.3 million copies. The band's second studio album, Some Nights, was released by Fueled by Ramen on February 21, 2012; it debuted at number three on the Billboard 200 and received a platinum certification from the Recording Industry Association of America (RIAA). The album's title track was released as its second single and peaked at number three on the Hot 100, while also reaching the top ten on other national singles charts. "Carry On", "Why Am I the One", and "All Alone" followed as the next three singles from Some Nights.

Studio albums

Extended plays

Singles

Other charted songs

Other appearances
"Please Leave a Light On When You Go" (featured on Song Reader)

Music videos

Notes

References

External links
 Official website
 Fun at AllMusic
 
 

Discographies of American artists
Alternative rock discographies
Rock music group discographies
Discography